Chagasia bathana is a mosquito species in the genus Chagasia.

It is found in Belize, Colombia, Costa Rica, Ecuador, Guatemala, Mexico, Nicaragua, Panama, Peru, Venezuela and French Guiana.

C. bathana is a mosquito species with eight chromosomes. The 2n=6 chromosome number is conserved in the entire family Culicidae, except in Chagasia bathana which has 2n=8.

See also 
 List of organisms by chromosome count

References 
 
 Baerg, D. C. and M. M. Boreham. 1974. Experimental rearing of Chagasia bathana (Dyar) using induced mating, and description of the egg stage (Diptera: Culicidae). Journal of Medical Entomology 11: 631-632.
 Dyar, H. G. 1928. pg. 244. In: D. P. Curry, A new anopheline mosquito, Anopheles (Chagasia) bathanus Dyar, discovered in the Canal Zone. American Journal of Tropical Medicine 8: 243-248.
 Fauran, P. and F. X. Pajot. 1974. Complement to the catalog of the Culicidae recorded from French Guiana (South America). Mosquito Systematics 6: 99-110.
 Gabaldon, A., J. Herrera, M. A. Perez-Vivas, and J. A. Rausseo. 1940. Estudio Sobre Anofelinos, Serie I. 6. Chagasia bathanus Dyar, 1928: Su Hallazgo en Venezuela y Nota Sobre Variaciones Morfológicas de las Pupas. Publicaciones División de Malariología, Caracas 5: 57-62.
 Komp, W. H. W. 1942. The anopheline mosquitoes of the Caribbean Region. The National Institute of Health Bulletin 179, 195 pp.
 Knight, K. L. and R. W. Chamberlain. 1948. A new nomenclature for the chaetotaxy of the mosquito pupa, based on a comparative study of the genera (Diptera: Culicidae). Proceedings of the Helminthological Society of Washington 15: 1-18

External links 
 

Anophelinae
Insects described in 1928
Diptera of South America